Chappe is a lunar impact crater that lies along the southwestern limb of the Moon. It is nearly attached to the northern limb of the walled plain Hausen, and an equal distance from the crater Pilâtre. To the north-northwest is Blanchard.

This crater lies along the outer rampart of the much larger Hausen, and is surrounded by uneven, hummocky terrain. The rim is roughly circular, with a small crater lying along the eastern edge. The inner walls and interior floor are uneven, particularly in the western half.

This crater was originally designated Hausen A before being assigned its current name by the IAU.

Chappe lies to the south of the Mendel-Rydberg Basin, a 630 km wide impact basin of Nectarian age.

References

 
 
 
 
 
 
 
 
 
 
 
 

Impact craters on the Moon